Nataya Lundberg (born March 28, 1992), also known as Praya Lundberg or Praya Suandokmai, or nicknamed Pu, is a Swedish Thai actress and model. She is the UNHCR or United Nations High Commissioner for Refugees' Goodwill Ambassador and the first Goodwill Ambassador from Southeast Asia.  She made her acting debut in the TV series Rak Dai Mai Thar Hua Jai Mai Pean and appeared in roles on TV hits such as Sao Noi Nai Tha Kieng Kaew (2004) and  Nang Sao Som Lon.
Her first role in film was in the comedy Maa Kap Phra (2006) and she also appeared in the action comedy Bangkok Adrenaline (2009).

Along with acting Praya maintains a successful modelling career; she led the LUX campaign at the age of 15 and since then starred on the covers of Vogue, Cosmopolitan, Harper's Bazaar, L'Officiel and Grazia.

Lundberg supports several charities including Operation Smile, Phrabatnampu and UNHCR. She is also a sport enthusiastic and was the first female actress to complete the 2015 Bangkok Marathon.

Early life
Praya was born on March 28, 1989 in Bangkok, Thailand to a Thai mother and a Swedish father. She studied at NIST International School in Bangkok, from which she graduated in 2007, and went on to earn a BA in Laws from Oxford Brooks University.

Career
Praya began her acting and modelling careers at the age of 13. She was by Channel 7 and made her acting debut in the TV series  Rak Dai Mai Thar Hua Jai Mai Paen. She also played in the TV hits Sao Noi Nai Takjieng Leaw, Nang Sao Som Lon,  Chan Ruk Tur Na and  Khon La Lok. Her first role in film was in the comedy Maa Kap Phea and  later starred in the comedy action Bangkok Adrenaline. Lundberg has featured on the covers of various fashion magazines including Vogue, Cosmopolitan, Harper's Bazaar, L'Officiel and Grazia. She also led campaigns for Lux and Mistine Cosmetics  and she is currently a brand ambassador for Under Armour and Swarovski In 2015 Praya started Nola's Health, featuring beauty and health products such as organic tea. In the same year she also launched her perfume Angel Kiss.

Due to her work with the United Nations High Commissioner for Refugees, Praya was named Southeast Asia's first UNHCR Goodwill Ambassador in 2017.

Filmography

TV Shows

Films

Awards

Endorsements

References

1989 births
Living people
Praya Lundberg
Praya Lundberg
Praya Lundberg
Praya Lundberg
Praya Lundberg
Praya Lundberg